The English Women's Amateur Championship is the women's national amateur match play golf championship of England. It was first played in 1912 and is currently organised by England Golf.

The English Women's Amateur Championship is contested through two phases. It begins with a 36-hole stroke play competition, with the leading 32 competitors progressing to the knock-out match play competition. All matches in the knock-out phase are played over 18 holes except the final, which is played over 36 holes.

It is a close event, entry being restricted to women born in England, or with one parent or grandparent born in England, or resident in England for five years (two years if under 18).

Joyce Wethered has been the most successful player, winning the event five times in succession from 1920 to 1924.

History
The event was initially organised by the National County Golf Alliance, an organisation formed in 1911, separate from the Ladies Golf Union, with the intention of running county and national events.The first English Ladies Championship was held at Prince's Golf Club, Sandwich in April 1912. 32 players qualified for the match-play stage, after an 18-hole stroke-play round. The final was over 18 holes and was won by Margaret Gardner who beat Beryl Cautley at the 20th hole. Gardner had been 5 up with 5 holes to play, but lost them all and the match went to extra holes. The second event was held in April 1913 at Notts Golf Club and was won by Winifred Brown by one hole, the final being extended to 36 holes.

In 1914, the Ladies Golf Union wanted to organise their own English Ladies Championship and a dispute arose with the National County Golf Alliance, leading to possibility of there being two competing events. However, the Alliance was disbanded in early 1914 and the Ladies Golf Union organised the event at Walton Heath Golf Club in June. The event continued to be restricted to English golfers, using the same format as in 1913. Cecil Leitch beat Gladys Bastin 2&1 in the final.

The Ladies Golf Union continued to run the event until the English Women's Golf Association was founded in 1952. The English Women's Golf Association merged with the English Golf Union in 2011. The English Golf Union was later renamed England Golf.

From 2012 to 2018 the event was run as a 72-hole stroke-play event. It returned to match-play in 2019 with an 18-hole final. Since 2020 the event has been played concurrently with the men's event. From 2020 the final has been played over 36 holes.

Winners

Source:

References

External links
England Golf

Amateur golf tournaments in the United Kingdom
Golf tournaments in England
1912 establishments in England
Recurring sporting events established in 1912